Joseph Daniel McGinness  (1914–2003), known as "Uncle Joe'", was an Aboriginal Australian activist and the first Aboriginal president of the Federal Council for the Advancement of Aborigines and Torres Strait Islanders (FCAATSI).

Early life and family
McGinness was born in 1914 in the Northern Territory to Alngindabu (also known as Lucy), a Kungarakany woman, and Stephen McGinness, an Irish prospector and operator of a tin mine. McGinness was baptised in his father's Catholic faith. The McGinnesses had five children; Joe's brother Val McGinness would also be an activist as well as a musician and sportsman. His sister, Margaret Edwards, was active in the Council for Aboriginal Rights in Melbourne in the 1960s.  Another brother, Jack McGinness, was also an activist, and  the Northern Territory's and Australia's first elected  Aboriginal union leader in 1955 as president of NAWU. 

When their father died, McGinness, aged eight, and his siblings were taken into Kahlin Compound for "half-caste" children in Darwin.

Career
McGinness served in Borneo in World War II, and upon his return worked on the docks in Cairns, when he was active in the Waterside Workers' Federation. His experience in the union movement  led him to political activism with the Cairns Aboriginal and Torres Strait Islander Advancement League and later the Federal Council for Aboriginal Advancement, later known as the Federal Council for the Advancement of Aborigines and Torres Strait Islanders (FCAATSI). He visited Adelaide, in South Australia, several times, to liaise with activists such as John Moriarty.

He worked on the campaign for the 1967 referendum regarding Aboriginal affairs in Australia.

He was also known as "Uncle Joe".

Honours

McGinness was made a Member of the Order of Australia in the 1990 Australia Day Honours list for service to the Aboriginal community.

Publications
Son of Alyandabu: My Fight for Aboriginal Rights  (1991) – autobiography

Works

References

Further reading

1914 births
2003 deaths
Australian indigenous rights activists
Australian people of Irish descent
Australian Roman Catholics
Members of the Order of Australia